The Ministry of Labour & Employment is one of the oldest and most important Ministries of the Government of India. This is an India's federal ministry which is responsible for enforcement of labour laws in general and legislations related to a worker’s social security. The Ministry aims to create a healthy work environment for higher production and productivity and to develop and coordinate vocational skill training and employment. However, Skill Development responsibilities, such as Industrial Training and Apprenticeship responsibilities were transferred to the Ministry of Skill Development and Entrepreneurship from 9 November 2014. The Ministry launched the National Career Service portal on 20 July 2015 to help bridge the gap between job providers and job seekers.

Role and Working

Functions
The thrust areas of the ministry are:
 Labour Policy and legislation
 Safety, health and welfare of labour
 Social security of labour
 Policy relating to special target groups such as women and child labour
 Industrial relations and enforcement of labour laws in the Central sphere
 Adjudication of industrial disputes through Central Government Industrial Tribunals cum Labour Courts and National Industrial Tribunals
 Workers' Education
 Labour and Employment Statistics
The results of recession  on employment in the eight selected sectors textiles including apparels, leather, metals, automobiles, gems & jewellery, transport, IT/BPO and handloom / powerloom were monitored starting from Oct–Dec 2008. The overall employment in the eight selected sectors covered in the quarterly surveys has increased by 10.66 lakh (0.16%). In IT/BPO sector the increase in the employment is maximum (6.9 lakh) during the year 2009–10.
 Emigration of Labour for employment abroad
 Employment services and vocational training
 Administration of Central Labour & Employment Services
 International co-operation in labour and employment matters

Organisation

Attached offices
 Directorate General of Employment 
 Office of Chief Labour Commissioner

Subordinate offices
 Directorate General of Mines Safety
 Welfare Commission

Statutory Bodies
 Employees State Insurance Corporation
 Employees Provident Fund Organisation
 National Institute for Career Services (Erstwhile CIRTES)
 V. V. Giri National Labour Institute
 Central Board for Workers Education

Autonomous bodies
 Central Government Industrial Tribunals and Labour Courts
 Central Labour Institute

Labour Ministers of India

Ministers of State

See also
Occupational Safety, Health and Working Conditions Code, 2020

References

External links
 Official Website of the Ministry of Labour and Employment
 National Career Service Portal
 Official Ministry Press Releases
 Organisation Chart of the Ministry of Labour and Employment
 Ministry of Labour Annual Report for Year 2011–2012
 International Labour Organisation, UN
 Child Labour in India and Women Labour in India
 Related Websites to Ministry of Labour
 Official Labour Statistics

Labour
India, Labour
Labour in India
Employment in India